Vitus Bering is a Russian icebreaking platform supply and standby vessel owned by Sovcomflot. Built by Arctech Helsinki Shipyard in Helsinki, Finland, she and her sister ship, Aleksey Chirikov, were ordered on 16 December 2010, shortly after the joint venture agreement between STX Finland Cruise Oy and United Shipbuilding Corporation had been signed. Delivered to the owners on 21 December 2012, Vitus Bering will be used in the Arkutun-Dagi offshore oil field in the Sea of Okhotsk.

Construction 

Only six days after the agreement for the formation of the company was signed between STX Finland Cruise Oy and United Shipbuilding Corporation on 10 December 2010, the newly founded Arctech Helsinki Shipyard received an order for two multipurpose icebreaking supply vessels from the Russian state-owned shipping company Sovcomflot. The value of the shipbuilding contract was US$200 million and the construction of the vessels would provide work for 1,000 man-years. Initially, the ships were to be delivered to the customer together in April 2013, after which they would be used for standby, supply and ice management of Berkut, an offshore platform operated by Exxon Neftegas Limited in the Arkutun-Dagi offshore oil field in the Sea of Okhotsk.

Although the ship was assembled at Arctech Helsinki Shipyard, the majority of the steel blocks were manufactured by the Russian Vyborg Shipyard as the Hietalahti shipyard no longer has such production capacity. Only five of the 42 hull blocks for the two vessels were manufactured locally in Helsinki to ramp up the production while the remaining blocks were produced and partially outfitted in Vyborg and then brought to Helsinki on a barge for final outfitting, painting and hull assembly. The steel-cutting ceremony for the first vessel was held at Vyborg Shipyard on 6 July 2011 and production began in Helsinki in August 2011.

The keel laying ceremony of the first vessel was held on 19 January 2012 when the first block, a 353-ton midship section manufactured in Helsinki, was lowered to the shipyard's covered drydock. Vitus Bering was launched and floated out on 30 June 2012. The hull assembly of the second vessel began in July and she was launched on 23 November 2012, one day after the first vessel left for one week sea trials. Vitus Bering was delivered to Sovcomflot on 21 December 2012, four months ahead of the original schedule. From Helsinki, she headed for St. Petersburg, where the new vessel was visited by president Vladimir Putin on 10 January 2013.

The ship is named after the Danish explorer Vitus Bering who, while in Russian service, became the first European to discover Alaska.

Technical details 

Vitus Bering is an upgraded version of SCF Sakhalin, a similar icebreaking platform supply vessel built at Helsinki in 2005. Several modifications have been made to the original design, including adding a fourth main engine, but the hull form is nearly identical. The most noticeable external difference is the covered foredeck, which will protect the mooring equipment from icing.

A double acting ship, Vitus Bering is designed to be able to break ice both ahead and astern. Her ice class, assigned by the Russian Maritime Register of Shipping, is Icebreaker6.

References 

2012 ships
Ships built in Helsinki
Icebreakers of Russia